José M. López (born May 29, 1949) is a former associate judge on the Superior Court of the District of Columbia.

Education and career 
López earned his Bachelor of Arts from Middlebury College in 1973, and his Juris Doctor from Suffolk University Law School in 1977.

D.C. Superior Court 
President George H. W. Bush nominated López on April 19, 1990, to a fifteen-year term as an associate judge on the Superior Court of the District of Columbia. On July 20, 1990, the Senate Committee on Governmental Affairs held a hearing on his nomination. On August 2, 1990, the Committee reported his nomination favorably to the senate floor. On August 4, 1990, the full United States Senate confirmed his nomination by unanimous consent. He retired from the court on December 31, 2021.

Personal life 
López was born in the Dominican Republic and grew up in Brooklyn, New York.

References

1949 births
Living people
20th-century American judges
21st-century American judges
Judges of the Superior Court of the District of Columbia
Middlebury College alumni
People from Santo Domingo
Suffolk University Law School alumni